Madera is the third station of the Medellín Metro from north to south on line A. It is located in the northernmost part of the municipality of Medellín, close to the natural boundary with Bello and is an access point to the southern suburbs of Bello. The station is named for the creek that forms a natural boundary between the cities of Medellín and Bello: La Madera Creek. The station was opened on 30 November 1995 as part of the inaugural section of line A, from Niquía to Poblado.

References

External links
 Official site of Medellín Metro 

Medellín Metro stations
Railway stations opened in 1995
1995 establishments in Colombia